Åsane is a former municipality in the old Hordaland county in Norway. The municipality existed from 1904 until 1972.  The  municipality encompassed the northern part of the Bergen Peninsula, roughly corresponding to the present-day borough of Åsane in the city-municipality of Bergen.  The administrative centre of the municipality was the village of Eidsvåg.  The main church for the municipality was Åsane Church.  Historically, the area was called Aasene, but with spelling reforms in the Norwegian language, the modern spelling has been Åsane since about 1920.

History
The large parish of Hammer existed for many centuries and within the parish existed the annex of Aasene.  On 1 January 1904, the annex of Aasene (population: 1,625) was separated from the rest of Hammer to become a separate municipality. The original municipality included the northern part of the Bergen Peninsula, except for the coastal areas along the Salhusfjorden and Sørfjorden.  On 1 July 1914, most of the northern coastal part of the Bergen peninsula (population: 644) was transferred to Aasene (except for the far northern tip around Tellevik).  On 1 July 1938, the far northern tip of the Bergen peninsula around the villages of Tellevik and Hordvik were transferred from Hamre municipality to Åsane. The new municipality was small, but over the next several decades, there was major population growth due to the growing city of Bergen, located to the southwest, over the mountains.  On 1 January 1972, the municipality of Åsane (population: 19,205) was merged into the city of Bergen (the other neighboring municipalities of Arna, Fana, and Laksevåg were also merged with Bergen on the same date).

Government
The municipal council  of Åsane was made up of 41 representatives that were elected to four year terms.  The party breakdown of the final municipal council was as follows:

Mayors
This is a list of the mayors who served Åsane:

See also
List of former municipalities of Norway

References

Geography of Bergen
Former municipalities of Norway
1904 establishments in Norway
1972 disestablishments in Norway